Nikolai Bushuev (born March 14, 1985) is a Russian professional ice hockey forward who currently plays for Severstal Cherepovets of the Kontinental Hockey League (KHL).

References

External links

1985 births
Living people
Avtomobilist Yekaterinburg players
HC Spartak Moscow players
Russian ice hockey forwards